Ministry of Agriculture and Forests (MOAF) is reanmed as Ministry of Agriculture and Livestock and is the ministry of Bhutan responsible to ensure sustainable social and economic well-being of the Bhutanese people through adequate access to food and natural resources.

Departments 
The Ministry of Agriculture and Livestock (MoAL) is responsible for:  
Department of Agriculture  
Department of Livestock
Department of Agricultural Marketing and Cooperatives
National Biodiversity Center
Rural Development Training Centre

State Owned Enterprises (SOEs) affiliated to MOAF are:
Green Bhutan Corporation Limited
Farm Machinery Corporation Limited
Bhutan Livestock Development Corporation Limited

Minister 
 Sangay Ngedup (in 2003-2007 as Minister of Agriculture)
 Pema Gyamtsho (in 2008-2013 as Minister of Agriculture and Forests)
 Lyonpo Yeshey Dorji (around 2016)
 Yeshey Penjor (7 November 2018 - ...)

References

Agriculture and Forests
Bhutan
Bhutan
Agricultural organisations based in Bhutan